Anderson Mateo López (born 25 January 1999) is a Dutch footballer who plays as a forward. He is currently a free agent.

Club career
A youth product of the AFC Ajax youth academy, López signed with AS Monaco FC and joined Cercle Brugge on loan immediately after as he recuperated from knee surgery. López made his professional debut for Cercle Brugge on 26 December 2018, in a 1–0 Belgian First Division A loss to Eupen. 

In 2020, he moved to Dutch club NEC as a free agent and was included in their under-21 team.

International career
López was born in the Netherlands and is of Dominican descent. He is a youth international for the Netherlands at various youth levels.

Honours 
Monaco
 Ligue 1: 2016–17

References

External links
Soccerway Profile
Cercle Brugge Profile
OnsOranje U17 Profile
Onsoranje U18 Profile
Vitesse Jeugd Profile

1999 births
Living people
People from Renkum
Dutch footballers
Netherlands youth international footballers
Dutch people of Dominican Republic descent
Sportspeople of Dominican Republic descent
Association football forwards
SBV Vitesse players
AFC Ajax players
Cercle Brugge K.S.V. players
AS Monaco FC players
NEC Nijmegen players
Belgian Pro League players
Dutch expatriate footballers
Dutch expatriate sportspeople in France
Expatriate footballers in France
Dutch expatriate sportspeople in Belgium
Expatriate footballers in Belgium
Footballers from Gelderland